Stefano Ludovico Straneo (also Lodovico) (Turin, 6 June 1902 – Milan, 9 December 1997) was an Italian entomologist, teacher, academic administrator and author.

His primary fields of interest were the beetles (Coleoptera), in particular the family of ground beetles (Carabidae, tribe Pterostichinae). He described 64 new genera and almost 1200 new species. His collections Coleoptera: Carabidae and Paussidae are on display in the Museo Civico di Storia Naturale in Milan.

Straneo's father was a theoretical physicist and an acquaintance of Albert Einstein. Straneo showed an early interest in biology and began collecting insects, eventually focusing on carabid beetles. He published his first paper in 1933, and was a prolific author for the next 64 years, publishing a total of 239 papers up to 1995.

Straneo was recipient of the Italian Golden Medal for Distinguished Educator in Culture And Art in 1972.

Works

1984 - Two new species or Pterostichini (Coleoptera, Carabidae) in the collections of the Museum of Natural History of the Humboldt University of Berlin.
1984 - Un nuovo genere del Camerun della tribù Pterostichini (Coleoptera Carabidae).
1983 - Nuovi pterostichini asiatici (Coleoptera, Carabidae).
1984 - Un nuovo Pterostichus dell'Anatolia occidentale (Col., Carabidae).
1984 - Sul genere Amolopsa Beach (Coleoptera Carabidae).

References

Italian entomologists
1902 births
1997 deaths
20th-century Italian zoologists